Unicity refers to various things.

As a city-zoning and city unification term, unicity may refer to:
 A section of the city of Winnipeg, Manitoba
 The unification of the City of Cape Town's local government
 The 1971 City of Winnipeg Act, which is often called unicity.
 Unicity is a European city in which students from Turkish and German schools co-create in the Cospaces environment within the eTwinning project in 2018.

Service
 The Unicity Bus System, which is a service of the city of Newark, New Jersey, and UD Transit of the University of Delaware.

Other
 A unicity theorem, often called a uniqueness theorem
 Unicity (computer science), a measure of the ease of re-identification of individuals in sets of metadata
 Unicity distance, a term in cryptography
 Unicity, an album by Edward Simon
 Unicity (philosophy), a concept that explains the particularity of each entity